R. Srinivasan is an Indian businessman. He is the founder of Redington India, a US$4.2 billion technology products supply chain solution company operating in India, the Middle East, Africa, and Turkey. Prior to starting Redington, he spent three years in Indonesia with a leading textile company between 1978 and 1981. Srinivasan also had significant stints with Reader's Digest and the Coca-Cola Corporation in India. Srinivasan holds an electrical engineering degree from Madras University and an MBA degree from the Indian Institute of Management Ahmedabad.

He is the chairman of SSN Institutions, sits on the board of HCL Technologies, Arena Bilgisayar San. ve Tic. A.S. (a listed company in Turkey) and Easyaccess Financial Services. He is also a trustee of Kidney Help Trust, Chennai, vice president of Music Academy, Chennai and member of management committee of Vidya Mandir Sr. Secondary School, Chennai.

References

Living people
Indian business executives
Indian company founders
Indian Institute of Management Ahmedabad alumni
University of Madras alumni
Year of birth missing (living people)